Cooper Legrand (born 30 December 1998) is a Mauritian professional footballer who plays as a midfielder for Kingston City and the Mauritius national football team.

Career statistics

Club

Notes

International

References

1998 births
Living people
Mauritian footballers
Mauritius international footballers
Richmond SC players
Kingston City FC players
Association football midfielders